Martin Fillmore Clark, Jr. (born June 23, 1959) is an author and retired Virginia circuit court judge.

Clark's first book, The Many Aspects of Mobile Home Living, was published by Alfred A. Knopf in 2000 and was a New York Times Notable Book for 2000, a Book-of-the-Month Club selection and a finalist for The Stephen Crane First Fiction Award.  

His second novel, Plain Heathen Mischief, was released in 2004 and was also published by Knopf.  

Clark's third novel, The Legal Limit, released in April 2008, again by Knopf, was a Washington Post Best Book of the Year for 2008, and, in October, 2009, was announced as the winner of the Library of Virginia's People's Choice Award for fiction. 

The Jezebel Remedy was published in June 2015 and appeared on several bestseller lists, rising to number three on Barnes and Noble's Top 100 Books. In reviewing The Jezebel Remedy, Entertainment Weekly stated that "Clark is, hands down, our finest legal-thriller writer." Additionally, The Jezebel Remedy was  chosen as a Boston Globe Best Book for 2015,  became a number one bestseller in Amazon's Fiction and Literature category and earned Clark a second Library of Virginia People's Choice Award for fiction.  Parkway Brewing Company named a beer The Remedy in honor of the novel.

The Substitution Order was released on July 9, 2019.  The novel was once again a bestseller for Clark, landing on several lists, including those compiled by SIBA and Barnes and Noble. It was a number one bestseller on multiple Amazon charts, and the audio version reached number one nationally.  The New York Times called The Substitution Order "a great legal thriller" and selected it as an Editors' Choice, and both SIBA and The Washington Post named it a Best Summer Book. In its review, The Washington Times confirmed that Clark is "often acclaimed as the country's best writer of legal thrillers." Clark won his third Library of Virginia People's Choice Award for fiction on October 17, 2020. 

Clark became a juvenile and domestic relations district court judge in 1992 and was appointed to the circuit court bench for the Virginia counties of Patrick and Henry in May 1995.  On April 27, 2016, he was presented with the Patrick County Outstanding Community Service Award.  In January 2018, the Virginia State Bar awarded him the Harry L. Carrico Professionalism Award. He retired as a judge on May 1, 2019.

Clark attended Woodberry Forest School. He graduated from Davidson College in 1981 and the University of Virginia School of Law in 1984.  He lives in Stuart, Virginia.

References

External links
New York Times profile

1959 births
Living people
Davidson College alumni
University of Virginia School of Law alumni
People from Virginia
Writers from Virginia
Place of birth missing (living people)
Virginia circuit court judges
Woodberry Forest School alumni